Kim Hwa-jong (born 22 March 1945) is a North Korean sports shooter. He competed in the mixed skeet event at the 1980 Summer Olympics.

References

1945 births
Living people
North Korean male sport shooters
Olympic shooters of North Korea
Shooters at the 1980 Summer Olympics
Place of birth missing (living people)